Fuchsia excorticata, commonly known as tree fuchsia, New Zealand fuchsia and by its Māori name kōtukutuku, is a New Zealand native tree belonging to the family Onagraceae. It is commonly found throughout New Zealand and as far south as the Auckland Islands. It is easily recognised in its native environment by the characteristic appearance of its bark, which peels spontaneously, hanging in red papery strips to show a pale bark underneath. Its scientific name, excorticata, reflects this distinctive property.

It is unusual among New Zealand trees in being deciduous in the southern parts of its range. The introduction of the common brushtail possum to New Zealand precipitated a serious decline in this species, particularly where large concentrations of the possum are present. F. excorticata appears to be one of the possum's preferred food sources, and they will browse individual trees to the point of defoliation after which the trees will die. The small dark purple berry is sweet and juicy. It was favoured by Māori who, unusually, gave the fruit its own name of kōnini; it was also eaten by European settlers in jams and puddings.

Description

Fuchsia excorticata is the largest species of Fuchsia in the world. This species differs in appearances from others in New Zealand. This species is deciduous, found most commonly in tree or shrub form. It typically grows to an average height of 12 meters high. It is distinguishable by a noticeably light brown/orange bark, which is extremely thin and paper like, peeling in strips. Overall trunk diameter tends to be 60 cm with stout outreaching branches.

Leaves
Main description of the leaves of this species include slim petioles, the join being approximately 1–4 cm long. The leaves tend to be up to 10 cm and ranging from 1.5–3 cm wide. Leaves tend to form an oblong shape with a rounded base. Leaves of Fuchsia excorticata have a smooth epidermis with the exception of the margin and veins. The leaf margin is serrated with small teeth. Leaf colour can vary the upper side generally being dark green and the underside being paler and more silver in colour. Leaves can sometimes be suffused with red or purple colouring. Fuchsia excorticata is uncommon for its characteristic of being deciduous in southern areas of New Zealand, where the majority of its competing species are large evergreen species. Therefore, in the winter months Fuchsia excorticata is conspicuous by being found with few to no leaves.

Flowers
Flowers are usually bright red to pink to purple in colour and often emerge from the main stem. Flowers are solitary and pendulous. The four showy sepals tend to be 5–16 mm long. Filaments tending to range from 7–12 mm in length and purplish in colour. The flowers of Fuchsia excorticata are gynodioecious.

Berries
Berries range to approximately 10 mm long, ellipsoid-oblong shaped, dark purple to almost black in colour.

Distribution

Natural global range
Fuchsia excorticata is endemic to New Zealand.

New Zealand range
Fuchsia excorticata has a range throughout the North and South Islands, as well as Stewart Island and the Auckland Islands.

Habitat preferences
Fuchsia excorticata is common in lowland and lower mountainous forest areas, especially on the forest margins, in clearings, and by streams. Even if a forest is close to being destroyed, or is destroyed, tree fuchsias are more than often not still standing because they are close to indestructible. This species is also abundant in cold mountain areas in the South Island.

Life cycle/phenology
The seeds of Fuchsia excorticata are fairly small, though are known to have persistence in the soil. It is unknown how long they are viable for, but can germinate in just two weeks if the conditions are suitable. In dark conditions, germination could take up to eight weeks. Because the seeds are so small, seedlings are fragile and may have a hard time establishing themselves. F. excorticata is a gynodioecious species, meaning it has separate hermaphrodite (male and female) and female parts. The female plants have a much harder time becoming pollinated, due to the limited number of birds (especially tui and bellbirds), which are the main pollinators of F. excorticata. This species flowers from August to December and produces berries from December to March.

Soil preference
Tree fuchsia can grow in riparian soil and can be utilised as a predecessor species for areas where conditions and soils are not the best. It likes moist soil with a canopy overhead for shade.

Predators, parasites, and diseases
Local birds such as tui, bellbirds, kererū, and silvereyes feed on tree fuchsia. Tui and kererū eat the flowers and fruit; other birds consume the nectar. Tree fuchsia can, and has in some locations, been pushed out of its habitat by plant competitors such as banana passionfruit and Buddleia. Mammalian threats, such as goats, have been known to forage on tree fuchsia, but they do not have as large an effect as possums. Possums put the tree at risk because they eat the fruit and seeds, and do this without stopping when seed production is low.

Cultural uses
Known as kōtukutuku in Māori, Fuchsia excorticata had many uses for the Māori people and early settlers of New Zealand. These uses included as a basic foodstuff, in jams, and use by Māori women in vapor baths after childbirth. Tannins in the bark were used as a natural agent in leather tanning. Fuchsia excorticata was also used to produce brightly coloured dyes.

References

External links

 Fuchsia excorticata, New Zealand Plant Conservation Network
 Bushmansfriend article and more photos
 Landcare Research - flora database

excorticata
Trees of New Zealand
Flora of the Auckland Islands